Corralillo is a district of the Cartago canton, in the Cartago province of Costa Rica.

Geography 
Corralillo has an area of  km² and an elevation of  metres.

Demographics 

For the 2011 census, Corralillo had a population of  inhabitants.

Transportation

Road transportation 
The district is covered by the following road routes:
 National Route 222
 National Route 228
 National Route 304
 National Route 406
 National Route 407

References 

Districts of Cartago Province
Populated places in Cartago Province